The 1962 County Championship was the 63rd officially organised running of the County Championship. Yorkshire won the Championship title.

Table
12 points for a win
6 points to side still batting in the fourth innings of a match in which scores finish level
2 points for first innings lead
2 bonus points for side leading on first innings if they also score faster on runs per over in first innings
If no play possible on the first two days, and the match does not go into the second innings, the side leading on first innings scores 8 points.
Teams played either 28 or 32 matches. Therefore, a final average was calculated by dividing the points by the matches played which determined the final placings.

References

1962 in English cricket
County Championship seasons